The 1949 Open Championship was the 78th Open Championship, held 6–9 July at Royal St George's Golf Club in Sandwich, Kent, England. Bobby Locke of South Africa won the first of his four Open titles in a 36-hole playoff, twelve strokes ahead of runner-up Harry Bradshaw of Ireland. It was the first playoff at the Open since 1933.

This edition was originally scheduled for Royal Cinque Ports, but it was flooded in early 1949 and the venue was switched to Royal St George's. Royal Cinque Ports was retained as a venue for one of the qualifying rounds.

Qualifying took place on 4–5 July, Monday and Tuesday, with 18 holes at Royal St. George's and 18 holes at Royal Cinque Ports. The number of qualifiers was limited to a maximum of 100, and ties for 100th place did not qualify. Bradshaw led the qualifiers scoring 139 with Locke next at 140; the qualifying score was 154 and 96 players advanced. The total prize money was increased fifty percent, from £1,000 to £1,500. The winner received £300 with £200 for second, £100 for third, £75 for fourth, £50 for fifth and then £20 each for the next 35 players. The £1,500 was completed with a £15 prize for winning the qualification event and four £15 prizes for the lowest score in each round. For the first time a silver medal was awarded to the first amateur.

In the opening round on Wednesday, Jimmy Adams led with 67. Locke entered as the favorite, but was in a tie for fourth place, despite taking seven at the 14th, cutting his tee shot out of bounds. After the second round on Thursday, Sam King had the lead on 140, Adams dropping back after a 77. At the 5th hole, Bradshaw's ball finished in a broken beer bottle; he decided to play it, getting the ball clear but dropping a shot on the hole. The maximum number of players making the cut after 36 holes was again set at forty, and ties for 40th place did not make the cut. With eleven players tied for 32nd place at 148, the cut was 147 (+3) and a record low 31 players advanced to the final two rounds.

After the morning round on Friday, there were three players tied for the lead on 213: Bradshaw, Locke, and Max Faulkner. Charlie Ward and King were just a stroke behind. Bradshaw was in one of the early groups and had a final round of 70 to take the lead on 283. Playing forty minutes later, Locke reached the turn in 32 but took five at the 10th, 14th, and 15th, and then three-putted the short 16th. None of the later players in contention could get close to Bradshaw and Locke. De Vicenzo had a good last round of 69 to take third place. His chances were spoilt by an inward half of 40 in the morning which had left his three strokes behind.

In the playoff on Saturday, both players started well but Locke had a three-shot lead after thirteen holes. At the 520-yard 14th hole, Locke put his second shot stone dead for a three while Bradshaw found a bunker and eventually took six. Locke's lead was thus extended to six and then to seven at the end of the morning round. The lead quickly extended to 10 after two holes of the afternoon round as Bradshaw started 6-5. Bradshaw gained a shot at the 9th and 11th, but Locke went on to win the playoff by twelve strokes.

Past champions in the field

Made the cut 

Source:

Missed the cut 

Source:

Did not enter:
 Henry Cotton (1934, 1937, 1948), Sam Snead (1946), Denny Shute (1933), Gene Sarazen (1932), Tommy Armour (1931).

Round summaries

First round
Wednesday, 6 July 1948

Source:

Second round
Thursday, 7 July 1949

Source:

Third round
Friday, 8 July 1949 (morning)

Source:

Final round
Friday, 8 July 1949 (afternoon)

Source:
Amateurs: Stranahan (+2), Francis (+19)

Playoff
Saturday, 9 July 1949

Scorecards
Morning round

Afternoon round

References

External links
Royal St George's 1949 (Official site)
1949 Open Championship (GolfCompendium.com)

The Open Championship
Golf tournaments in England
Open Championship
Open Championship
Open Championship